Fremont County Courthouse in St. Anthony, Idaho was built in 1909. It was listed on the National Register of Historic Places in 1979. The architects who designed the building were Wayland & Fennell.

References

External links

 The National Register of Historic Places in Idaho

County courthouses in Idaho
Courthouses on the National Register of Historic Places in Idaho
Neoclassical architecture in Idaho
Government buildings completed in 1909
Buildings and structures in Fremont County, Idaho
National Register of Historic Places in Fremont County, Idaho